Norman Lyle Larson (October 13, 1920 — December 22, 2001) was a Canadian ice hockey right winger. He played 89 games in the National Hockey League between 1940 and 1947 for the New York Americans, Brooklyn Americans, and New York Rangers. The rest of his career, which lasted from 1940 to 1953, was spent in various minor leagues. He was born in Moose Jaw, Saskatchewan.

Career statistics

Regular season and playoffs

External links
 

1920 births
2001 deaths
Brooklyn Americans players
Calgary Stampeders (WHL) players
Canadian ice hockey right wingers
Canadian people of Norwegian descent
Hershey Bears players
Ice hockey people from Saskatchewan
Kimberley Dynamiters players
Moose Jaw Canucks players
New Haven Ramblers players
New York Americans players
Springfield Indians players
Sportspeople from Moose Jaw
Canadian expatriates in the United States